Ayid Habshi (or Habashi, ; born 10 May 1995) is an Israeli footballer who plays as a centre back for Ironi Kiryat Shmona.

Early life
Habshi was born in Iksal, Israel, to a Muslim-Arab family.

Club career 
Habshi began his career with Hapoel Rishon Lezion, and when he was 14 years old he moved to Maccabi Haifa's youth academy. On 28 November 2012 Habshi made his debut with Maccabi Haifa's senior team, when he opened the game in a 3-2 Toto cup's loss against Maccabi Netanya. On 21 April 2012 Habshi made his debut in the Israel Premier League in a 2–1 loss against Bnei Yehuda Tel Aviv. During the 2013–14 season, he participated in 3 games of Maccabi Haifa's senior team and continued to play with the youth academy.

On 3 February 2015, Habshi was loaned to Bnei Sakhin in a loan deal which included the moving of Abraham Paz to Maccabi Haifa. In Bnei Sakhin he was usually a lineup player and participated in 13 games until the end of the 2014–15 season. Habshi returned to Maccabi Haifa prior to the beginning of the 2015–16 season. During that season, he participated in 15 games and played an important role in winning the Israel State Cup

On 14 June 2017, Habshi made his European debut in a 1-1 draw against Nõmme Kalju. On 1 February 2017, he was loaned to Hapoel Ranana and there he participated in 4 games until the end of the 2016–17 season. On 27 June 2017, Habshi was loaned to Bnei Yehuda Tel Aviv. On 9 December 2017 he scored his first career goal in a 2–1 win against Maccabi Netanya. During the  2017–18 season, Habshi was a lineup player for all 36 Maccabi Netanya league games and the team finished the season on the top playoff.

Habshi returned to Haifa for the 2017–18 season.

On 20 August 2019, it was reported that Habshi has signed a 5-year extension with the club. Habshi added that "Maccabi Haifa is more than a home for me. It is a family and a way of life. I am happy about the club's belief in me and to stay here for the next few years. I will continue giving my all for the club and its amazing fans."

Honours

Club
Maccabi Haifa
 Israeli Premier League (1): 2020–21
 Israel State Cup (1): 2015–16

References

Habshi page in Maccabi Haifa website

1995 births
Living people
Israeli footballers
Maccabi Haifa F.C. players
Bnei Sakhnin F.C. players
Hapoel Ra'anana A.F.C. players
Bnei Yehuda Tel Aviv F.C. players
Hapoel Ironi Kiryat Shmona F.C. players
Israel youth international footballers
Israel under-21 international footballers
Israel international footballers
Footballers from Northern District (Israel)
Israeli Premier League players
Arab-Israeli footballers
Arab citizens of Israel
Association football central defenders
Israeli Muslims